Europa Universalis: Rome is a grand strategy game developed by Paradox Development Studio. Published by Paradox Interactive and released in 2008, it became the fourth installment in the Europa Universalis series. It was the second game to be based on Paradox's Clausewitz Engine.

Gameplay and release 
The game is set during the time of the Roman Republic, beginning in 280 BC with the start of the Pyrrhic war, and ending with the rise of the Roman Empire in 27 BC. Players have a choice of leading any of over 53 factions, which represent 10 prominent cultures including Carthaginian, Celtic, Egyptian, Greek, and Roman. The game was released for Microsoft Windows in April 2008, followed by an OS X version ported by Virtual Programming in July.

Editions 
The game's only expansion, Vae Victis, was released in November 19, 2008. Paradox had ideas for a second expansion based around the timeline of Alexander the Great, but this was never developed.

Virtual Programming published the Mac OS X version of the Europa Universalis: Rome Gold Edition on 23 July 2010, which includes the Vae Victis expansion pack.

Reception

See also

2008 in video gaming
Imperator: Rome, a sequel to the Europa Universalis: Rome
List of grand strategy video games 
List of Paradox Interactive games 
Wargame (video games)

References

External links
Official wiki 

2008 video games
Grand strategy video games
MacOS games
Paradox Interactive games
Real-time strategy video games
Video games developed in Sweden
Video games set in the Roman Empire
Video games with expansion packs
Windows games
Video games set in antiquity